Harris Taylor "Pop" Collier (May 28, 1876 – May 4, 1935) was an American college football coach. He served as the head coach for Tulane (1899) and Georgia Tech (1900). Collier attended the University of Virginia, where he played on the football team and served as the team captain in 1898.

Biography
A native of McKenzie, Tennessee, Collier attended the University of North Carolina at Chapel Hill. He played on the football team in 1895 as a guard. He also played on the baseball team as a right fielder and pitcher. Collier then attended the University of Virginia, where he studied medicine. He played on the baseball team, and from 1896 to 1898, on the football team. According to a fraternity newsletter, he was considered "one of the best tackles Virginia has ever had." Collier held the position of football team captain in 1898. The yearbook, Corks and Curls ranked him as the best "all-around athlete". At Virginia, he was the vice president of the Tennessee Club.

Collier then attended the Tulane University School of Medicine from which he graduated in 1900. He was a member of Sigma Nu and Theta Nu Epsilon. While a medical student, Collier also coached the Tulane football team. The Olive and Blue scored no points and finished the season with a 0–6–1 record. Following his time at Tulane, Collier coached at Georgia Tech for the 1900 season, finishing 0-4-0.

Collier died at the age of 58 at his home on May 4, 1935, of a cerebral hemorrhage.

Head coaching record

References

External links
 

1876 births
1935 deaths
19th-century players of American football
American football tackles
Baseball outfielders
Baseball pitchers
North Carolina Tar Heels baseball players
North Carolina Tar Heels football players
Tulane Green Wave football coaches
Georgia Tech Yellow Jackets football coaches
Virginia Cavaliers baseball players
Virginia Cavaliers football players
Tulane University alumni
Sportspeople from Memphis, Tennessee
People from McKenzie, Tennessee
Coaches of American football from Tennessee
Players of American football from Memphis, Tennessee
Baseball players from Memphis, Tennessee